bob hund is the debut release by bob hund. Produced and mixed by Eggstone and bob hund. Sound improvements by Peter In De Betou, Cutting Room. Graphic design and concept by Martin Kann. Photo by Henrik Håkansson.

Track listing
(English translation within parentheses)
 "Allt på ett kort" – 2:31 (double meaning: "all-in" but also "all in one picture")
 "Rundgång, gräslök, fågelsång" – 2:11 ("Feedback, chives, birdsong")
 "Kompromissen" – 3:54 ("The compromise")
 "5 meter upp i luften" – 4:51 ("5 meters up in the air")
 "Fotoalbumet" – 3:26 ("The photo album")
 "Den ensamme sjömannens födelsedag" – 3:11 ("The lonesome sailor's birthday")

Notes

1993 debut albums
Bob Hund albums